The MTV Video Music Award for Best Dance Video was first awarded in 1989, and it was one of the original four genre categories that were added to the MTV Video Music Awards that year.  With a revamp of the awards in 2007, the category was cut out along with several others, yet it returned for the 2008 awards, where it was given a new name: Best Dancing in a Video.  In 2009 the award for Best Dancing was again eliminated from the VMAs, but it was revived again in 2010 as Best Dance Music Video.  The following year, though, the award was once again absent from the category list.  Once again, the award was revived in 2012, this time under the name of Best Electronic Dance Music Video, celebrating the rise in popularity of EDM throughout the year. It was again eliminated for the 2013 awards. On July 17, 2014, MTV brought the category back, this time renaming it the MTV Clubland Award for the 2014 Awards. The pattern of awarding the moonman every other year continued in 2016 where the award was renamed Best Electronic Video.  Finally, in 2017 this award's name was changed to Best Dance, which it has kept until the present. It was again eliminated for the 2020 awards.

En Vogue, The Pussycat Dolls, Calvin Harris, and Zedd are the category's biggest winners, with each having won it twice.  Madonna and Janet Jackson, on the other hand, are the two most nominated artists, each having been nominated six times for this category; followed by Jennifer Lopez and Calvin Harris, who have been nominated five times.

Recipients

References

See also 
 MTV Europe Music Award for Best Electronic

MTV Video Music Awards
Dance music awards
Awards established in 1989